Arianit "Ari" Shaqiri (born 27 August 1988) is a Swiss-Albanian youth football coach and the founder of PrioSocc Academy. He is the eldest brother of Swiss-Albanian professional football player Xherdan Shaqiri.

Early life
Arianit Shaqiri was born on 27 August 1988 in Zhegër, Gjilan, Kosovo. He is the oldest of four siblings, one of them being the professional footballer Xherdan Shaqiri. His parents, Isa and Fatime, are Kosovo Albanian immigrants who migrated from Kosovo to Augst, Switzerland when Shaqiri was very young. His father worked as a laborer, while his mother as a cleaner.

While growing up, Shaqiri wanted to become a police officer. In 2012, he completed his apprenticeship as an auto mechanic and a full-service as a fusilier in the Swiss Armed Forces.

Career
Shaqiri started his football career by playing in the FC Augst and FC Pratteln youth teams. Later, he played in the FC Basel's U14 to the U18 teams. His teammates there included Ivan Rakitić, Yann Sommer, Zdravko Kuzmanović, Timm Klose, and Simone Grippo, who were later called to play for the Switzerland national youth teams. Due to a knee injury, Shaqiri was unable to become a professional footballer, and made it only to the 2. Liga Interregional.

In 2012, Shaqiri moved in Munich, Germany to live with his brother Xherdan who transferred to Bayern Munich. When Xherdan transferred to Inter Milan in 2015, Arianit briefly lived in Milan, Italy with him, then moved back to Switzerland to live with his other family members. There, he established PrioSocc Academy, a football camp for kids aged 6 to 16 that has six coaches, five of whom are Albanian from Kosovo and North Macedonia.

References

External links
 

1988 births
Living people
People from Gjilan
Association football midfielders
Kosovan footballers
Kosovan emigrants to Switzerland
Swiss men's footballers
Swiss people of Kosovan descent
Swiss people of Albanian descent
Swiss Muslims